Guilford College is a private liberal arts college in Greensboro, North Carolina. Guilford has both traditional students and students who attend its Center for Continuing Education (CCE). Founded in 1837 by members of the Religious Society of Friends (Quakers), Guilford's program offerings include such majors as Peace and Conflict Studies and Community and Justice Studies, both rooted in the college's history as a Quaker institution. Its campus has been considered a National Historic District by the United States Department of the Interior since 1990.

History
Guilford College is the only Quaker-founded college in the southeastern United States. Opening in 1837 as New Garden Boarding School, the institution became a four-year liberal arts college under its current name, Guilford College, in 1888. Levi Coffin, a well-known abolitionist, Quaker, and political dissenter grew up on the land, which is now considered a historical site. The woods of New Garden, which still exist on campus today, were used as a meeting point for the Underground Railroad in the 19th century, run by Coffin.

COVID-19 challenges

Jane Fernandes, having served as president since 2014, chose to furlough and lay off colleagues during the COVID-19 pandemic and announced that she would leave office on June 30, 2021, followed by a one-year sabbatical and transition to a tenured faculty position in English. Carol Moore was appointed the interim president and she began a "program prioritization" process that would significantly reduce the number of majors offered once approved. The college announced in November 2020 that it would likely discontinue 19 out of its 42 majors and cut 16 tenured professors. In November 2020, as a response to this plan, the faculty voted no confidence in Moore and the Board of Trustees' leadership, the first no-confidence vote in the college's history. Moore subsequently left the college and Jim Hood, a faculty member, was selected as the new interim president at the end of February 2021.

In early 2021, the college paused the November 2020 layoff plans and began significant fundraising effort, placing a hold on the layoff question until after the spring semester. As of late March 2021, the fundraising plan was slightly ahead of schedule. On January 1, 2022, Kyle Farmbry became Guilford's 10th president.

Athletics

Guilford athletic teams are the Quakers. The college is a member at the Division III level of the National Collegiate Athletic Association (NCAA), primarily competing as a member of the Old Dominion Athletic Conference (ODAC) since the 1988–89 academic year. The Quakers previously competed in the Carolinas Intercollegiate Athletic Conference (CIAC, now Conference Carolinas) of the National Association of Intercollegiate Athletics (NAIA) from 1930–31 to 1987–88.

Guilford competes in 20 intercollegiate varsity sports: Men's sports include baseball, basketball, cross country, football, golf, lacrosse, soccer, tennis and track & field; while women's sports include basketball, cross country, lacrosse, rugby, soccer, softball, swimming, tennis, track & field, triathlon and volleyball.

Accomplishments
The school has won five national championships, including the NAIA men's basketball championship in 1973, the 1981 NAIA women's tennis title and the 1989 (NAIA), 2002 and 2005 (NCAA Division III) men's golf titles.

Campus events
Bryan Series.  In the past decade, Guilford's Bryan Series has brought many notable speakers to the campus and city for an annual public lecture series. Past speakers have included Desmond Tutu, Mikhail Gorbachev, Colin Powell, Madeleine Albright, Bill Clinton, Tony Blair, Ken Burns, Mary Robinson, David McCullough, Toni Morrison, and Venus Williams.

Eastern Music Festival (EMF).  Every summer, the college hosts the five-week-long Eastern Music Festival (EMF), where professional and student musicians come together for seminars and public performances.  Each year, EMF features more than 70 concerts and music-related events on- and off-campus.

Serendipity.  The largest campus-wide event of the year is "Serendipity", held annually in the spring.  It began in 1972 as a replacement to the somewhat antiquated May Day festivities, and has featured games, musical performances, and "general mayhem." During its peak in the late 1980s and early 1990s, the weekend festival was attended by Guilford students and alumni and thousands of students from other local institutions in the Triad area.  Musical acts wt this event include Dave Matthews Band, Widespread Panic, Hootie, the Blowfish, Common, Talib Kweli, De La Soul, Luscious Jackson, Tand the Violent Femmes, Man Man, The Village People, and The Squirrel Nut Zippers.

WTH?! Con This event has occurred annually since 2001. Major guests include a host of webcomic creators and wrock bands. The 2018 event attracted around 300 attendees. Peak attendance has been around 500 people. The most recent con was held the weekend of March 15, 2019.

Notable faculty
David Hammond, notable director, was a Theater Studies Professor at Guilford.
Mary Mendenhall Hobbs, wife of Guilford President L. L. Hobbs raised funds for women's education.
David Newton, an American sculpture artist worked as a Guilford art professor.
Adam Daniel Beittel, minister and former president of Tougaloo College

Notable alumni
Mary Ann Akers: 1991, reporter for Roll Call
M. L. Carr: 1973, ABA/NBA player, head coach and executive
Howard Coble: 1953, member of U.S. House of Representatives (6th District, N.C.)
Joseph M. Dixon: 1889, U.S. representative, Senator and Governor of Montana
Rick Elmore: 1974, judge, North Carolina Court of Appeals
Rick Ferrell: 1928, Major League Baseball player and member of the Baseball Hall of Fame
John Hamlin Folger: U.S. representative
World B. Free (formerly Lloyd Free): 1976, NBA player
Griff Garrison: 2020, professional wrestler
Rick Goings: CEO of Tupperware
Greg Jackson: 1974, NBA player
Bob Kauffman: 1968, three-time NBA All-Star and NBA head coach/general manager
Jennifer King: 2006, first full-time Black female coach in NFL history
Penelope W. Kyle: 1969, president of Radford University
Junior Lord: 1998, Arena Football player
Warren Mitofsky: 1957, inventor of the exit poll
Dave Odom: 1965, head men's basketball coach of East Carolina, Wake Forest & Univ. of South Carolina, now chairman of Maui Invitational Basketball Tournament EA Sports Maui Invitational
Thomas Gilbert Pearson: 1897, Secretary and later President of the National Audubon Society
William Queen: 1981, author of New York Times bestseller Under and Alone
Doc Searls: 1969, journalist, Cluetrain author
Ernie Shore: 1913, professional baseball player and Guilford professor
D. H. Starbuck: circa 1840, North Carolina lawyer and political figure who served as United States Attorney for the entire state, and then for the Western District of North Carolina after the state was divided into two districts, delegate from Forsyth County to the state constitutional conventions of 1861 and 1865, and elected state superior court judge.
Ben Strong, 2008, professional basketball player
Sam Venuto: NFL Running Back for the 1952 Washington Redskins. Long time high school Athletic Director and football coach. Member of the New Jersey Coaches Hall of Fame.
Tony Womack: 1992, Major League Baseball player, 2001 World Series Champion with the Arizona Diamondbacks.
Hunter Yurachek: 1990, athletic director at the University of Arkansas
Tom Zachary: 1917, Major League Baseball player best known for pitching Babe Ruth's 60th home run.

See also
 WQFS

References

External links 
 

 
 Official athletics website

 
 Liberal arts colleges in North Carolina
 Quaker universities and colleges
 Private universities and colleges in North Carolina
 University and college buildings on the National Register of Historic Places in North Carolina
 Universities and colleges in Greensboro, North Carolina
 Educational institutions established in 1837
 Colonial Revival architecture in North Carolina
 Neoclassical architecture in North Carolina
 Gothic Revival architecture in North Carolina
 Universities and colleges accredited by the Southern Association of Colleges and Schools
 Historic districts on the National Register of Historic Places in North Carolina
 Quakerism in North Carolina
1837 establishments in North Carolina
 National Register of Historic Places in Guilford County, North Carolina